Summer Heat is a 1987 film drama written and directed by Michie Gleason, with a screenplay by Michie Gleason based on the novel Here to Get My Baby Out of Jail by Louise Shivers. It stars Lori Singer.

Plot
In rural North Carolina in the post-Depression late 1930s, Roxy Walston is only 17 when she marries a boy she knows, Aaron. They have a child (called Baby) and live and work on a farm that raises tobacco.
 
Roxy's father, who operates a mortuary, sends a young drifter named Jack Ruffin their way to be a farmhand. Jack has an affair with Roxy, with tragic results.

Cast
Lori Singer as Roxy Walston
Anthony Edwards as Aaron
Bruce Abbott as Jack Ruffin
Kathy Bates as Ruth
Clu Gulager as Will
Dorothy McGuire as Narrator (voice)

External links 
 
 
 

1987 films
Atlantic Entertainment Group films
Films scored by Richard Stone (composer)
1987 drama films
American drama films
1980s English-language films
1980s American films
English-language drama films